Darold Duane Knowles (born December 9, 1941) is an American former professional baseball pitcher and coach, who played in Major League Baseball (MLB) from  through , most notably as a member of the Oakland Athletics dynasty that won three consecutive World Series championships between  and . In the 1973 World Series, Knowles became the first pitcher to appear in all seven games of a World Series. He also played for the Baltimore Orioles, Philadelphia Phillies, Washington Senators / Texas Rangers, Chicago Cubs, Montreal Expos, and St. Louis Cardinals. Knowles batted and threw left-handed. In 2014, he was hired as the pitching coach of the Florida State League's Dunedin Blue Jays.

Playing career

Baltimore Orioles
Knowles attended Brunswick High School, then signed with the Baltimore Orioles in  after attending the University of Missouri. He spent four seasons in their farm system, going 45–28 with a 2.83 earned run average (ERA), mostly as a starter. Knowles made his debut with the Orioles on April 18, 1965, pitching 1.2 innings out of the bullpen, and giving up five earned runs before returning to the triple A Rochester Red Wings. Upon completion of the International League (IL) season, Knowles received a September call back up to Baltimore. He went 0–1 with a 6.92 ERA in his return. The loss came against the Detroit Tigers, in Knowles’ only start.

Philadelphia Phillies
Knowles was traded with Jackie Brandt to the Phillies for Jack Baldschun on December 6, 1965. He won the season opener against the St. Louis Cardinals, pitching six innings of one-run ball to earn his first career win. His first career save came on May 12 against the Los Angeles Dodgers. For the  season, Knowles earned 13 saves. His 69 appearances, all in relief, were the third highest total of any pitcher in the league. At the end of his only season in Philadelphia, he was traded to the Washington Senators for Don Lock.

Washington Senators
He was used 32 times in  when his season was cut short by President Lyndon B. Johnson's reserve call-up of the USAF's 113th Tactical Fighter Wing in which he was an airman first class. He returned to the Senators in May , and went 4–1 with four saves and a 2.01 ERA to earn his only career All-Star nod.

Oakland A's
On May 8, 1971, the first-place Oakland Athletics acquired Knowles and Mike Epstein for Frank Fernandez, Paul Lindblad, and Don Mincher. Knowles only allowed four of 35 inherited runners to score, and earned seven saves and five wins out of a bullpen that already included Rollie Fingers and Bob Locker. The A's won the American League West by 16 games over the Kansas City Royals, but were swept by the Baltimore Orioles in the 1971 American League Championship Series. Knowles' only series appearance came in game three.

In , Knowles went 5–1 with a 1.37 ERA and 11 saves, but he was lost for the postseason due to a broken thumb.

1973 World Series
The Athletics repeated as American League champions, and faced the New York Mets in the 1973 World Series. Knowles appeared in all seven games of the World Series, pitching  innings without giving up an earned run, and earning the saves in games one and seven. He is one of only two pitchers to appear in all seven games of a World Series (the other pitcher being Brandon Morrow, in ).

In his 1980 autobiography, Athletics manager Alvin Dark recalled that Knowles "was having a bad year" in 1974. In one game where Knowles struggled, Dark came to the mound to remove him from the game. Knowles argued with him on the mound, protesting that he would not get in shape unless he was able to pitch him more often. "Why don't you trade me?" he asked Dark when they got back to the dugout. "Because nobody wants you, that's why!" Dark retorted. Knowles went 3–3 with a 4.22 ERA and blowing two of his five save opportunities. His .296 batting average against was the highest in the Oakland bullpen. Shortly after the World Series, he, Bob Locker and Manny Trillo were dealt to the Chicago Cubs for Billy Williams.

Final years
Shortly before spring training , Knowles was dealt to the Rangers for a player to be named later (Gene Clines) and cash. He went 5–2 with a 3.22 ERA and four saves to help the Rangers to a second-place finish. After the season, he was reunited with his former A's manager Dick Williams when his contract was sold to the Expos. He appeared in 60 games with the Expos, going 3–3 with six saves and a 2.38 ERA.

Knowles did not enjoy playing in Canada, citing taxes, language problems and political unrest in Quebec as the reasons for his displeasure. After just one season in Montreal, Knowles signed a two-year deal with his home team Cardinals.

He made just two appearances in April  before retiring and accepting a coaching position in the Cardinals' farm system. At the time of his retirement, he was tied for 13th in career saves.

In between, Knowles played winter ball with the Tiburones de La Guaira club of the Venezuelan League in the 1964–1965 season, where he posted a 13-9 record with a 2.37 ERA and 155 strikeouts to earn Triple Crown honors.

Coaching career
After serving eight years as a minor league roving pitching coach for the Cardinals, Knowles was hired as the Philadelphia Phillies' pitching coach in January  by new manager Nick Leyva. Under Knowles, the Phillies' pitching staff, which had a National League worst 4.14 ERA and in 1988, they showed improvement the next year but Knowles was moved to a minor league coaching position after the  season.

In 2001 Knowles became the pitching coach for the Nashville Sounds, AAA affiliate of the Pittsburgh Pirates.

On January 13, 2005, Knowles was named as the pitching coach for the Toronto Blue Jays Single-A affiliate Dunedin Blue Jays.

Knowles was named to the Florida State League Baseball Hall of Fame in 2012.

References

External links

Darold Knowles at SABR (Baseball BioProject)
Darold Knowles at Baseball Almanac
Darold Knowles at Baseballbiography.com
Darold Knowles at Pura Pelota (Venezuelan Professional Baseball League)

1941 births
Living people
Aberdeen Pheasants players
American expatriate baseball players in Canada
American expatriate baseball players in Venezuela
Baltimore Orioles players
Baseball coaches from Missouri
Baseball players from Missouri
Charlotte Hornets (baseball) players
Chicago Cubs players
Elmira Pioneers players
Major League Baseball pitchers
Major League Baseball pitching coaches
Missouri Tigers baseball players
Montreal Expos players
Oakland Athletics players
People from Brunswick, Missouri
Philadelphia Phillies coaches
Philadelphia Phillies players
Rochester Red Wings players
St. Louis Cardinals coaches
St. Louis Cardinals players
Stockton Ports players
Texas Rangers players
Tiburones de La Guaira players
University of Missouri alumni
Washington Senators (1961–1971) players